Eupithecia dohertyi is a moth in the family Geometridae described by Louis Beethoven Prout in 1935. It is found in Cameroon, Equatorial Guinea, Kenya, Rwanda, and Uganda.

Subspecies
Eupithecia dohertyi dohertyi (Kenya, Rwanda, Uganda)
Eupithecia dohertyi fulvata D. S. Fletcher, 1951 (Uganda)
Eupithecia dohertyi fumata D. S. Fletcher, 1951 (Cameroon, Equatorial Guinea )

References

Moths described in 1935
dohertyi
Moths of Africa